What Really Happens on the Gold Coast is an Australian reality documentary television series that airs on the Seven Network.

The series is the second spin-off of the 2014 program What Really Happens in Bali, following the 2015 series What Really Happens in Thailand, and is produced by the same production company McAvoy Media. The series will film Australian locals, workers and tourists in various locations on the Gold Coast, including nightclubs, hospitals and cosmetic surgery centres. It was filmed between November 2014 and January 2015, and will include scenes from Schoolies celebrations from 2014.

Broadcast
The series debuted in Australia on the Seven Network on 3 February 2016.

Episodes

References

External links
 

Seven Network original programming
2016 Australian television series debuts
Australian factual television series
Australian television spin-offs
English-language television shows
Television shows set in Gold Coast, Queensland